The 2017–18 SAFA Second Division (known as the ABC Motsepe League for sponsorship reasons) was the 20th season of the SAFA Second Division, the third tier for South African association football clubs, since its establishment in 1998. Due to the size of South Africa, the competition was split into nine divisions, one for each region. After the league stage of the regional competition was completed, the nine winning teams of each regional division entered the playoffs.

It was won by Maccabi F.C., who beat TS Sporting 5-4 on penalties. Both teams were promoted to the 2018-19 National First Division

Regions

Eastern Cape

F.C. Buffalo and Mthatha City were both expelled from the league.

Free State

Young Masters were expelled from the league.

Gauteng

Kwazulu-Natal

Limpopo

Mpumalanga

Northern Cape

Stream A

Stream B

North-West

Western Cape

References 

SAFA Second Division seasons
2017–18 in South African soccer leagues